Bicyclus trilophus, the tufted bush brown, is a butterfly in the family Nymphalidae. It is found in Guinea, Sierra Leone, Ivory Coast, Ghana, Nigeria, Cameroon, Gabon, the Republic of the Congo, the Democratic Republic of the Congo and Zambia. The habitat consists of forests.

Subspecies
Bicyclus trilophus trilophus (Cameroon (east of mountains), Gabon, Congo, Democratic Republic of the Congo, Zambia)
Bicyclus trilophus jacksoni Condamin, 1961 (Guinea, Sierra Leone, Ivory Coast, Ghana, Nigeria, western Cameroon)

References

Elymniini
Butterflies described in 1914